The Confrontation is a 1969 Hungarian drama film directed by Miklós Jancsó. It was listed to compete at the 1968 Cannes Film Festival, but the festival was cancelled due to the events of May 1968 in France.

Cast
 Andrea Drahota as Jutka Lantos
 Kati Kovács as Teri Szabó
 Lajos Balázsovits as Laci Fekete
 András Kozák as András Kozma
 András Bálint as András, Jewish boy
 József Madaras as Father Kellér
 István Uri as Pista
 Tibor Orbán as Schoolmaster
 Adrienne Csengery as College girl
 Miklós Csányi as Miki
 Ferenc Deák B. as János

References

External links

1969 films
1969 drama films
1960s Hungarian-language films
Films directed by Miklós Jancsó
Hungarian drama films